DeltaHawk Engines, Inc.  is an American aircraft engine manufacturer.

The company builds Diesel and Jet-A-fuelled engines for general aviation aircraft.

DeltaHawk engines have been tested in a Velocity RG homebuilt aircraft, an Australian Delta D2 helicopter and retrofitted in a Cirrus SR20 certified aircraft. In 2011 The State of Wisconsin and the city of Racine, Wisconsin granted low-interest loans to expand the company's production capability.

DeltaHawk was originally working toward a 2012 Federal Aviation Administration certification of its engine line and later set a goal of 2015, but these were not achieved.

The Ruud family, led by Alan Ruud, took controlling interest in the company in May 2015. Their plans include development of the existing models in the engine line, plus development of higher horsepower engines for certified light aircraft.

Engines 
DH160A4/V4/R4  V-4
DH180A4/V4/R4  V-4

References

External links 
 www.deltahawk.com — official site

Aircraft engine manufacturers of the United States
Aviation in Wisconsin
Companies based in Racine, Wisconsin